Giuseppe Arcidiacono (1927–1998) was an Italian physicist, born in Acireale. He earned his degree in physics at the University of Catania in 1951.

Arcidiacono was mathematician Luigi Fantappiè's main disciple. Together they worked on what they called projective relativity at the Istituto Nazionale di Alta Matematica in Rome. 

In 1958 Arcidiacono won a scholarship to the Istituto H. Poincaré in Paris. He won the mathematics prize from the Accademia Nazionale dei Lincei. From 1969 until his death in 1998 he was Professor of Mechanical Engineering at the University of Perugia.

References

External links
www.giuseppearcidiacono.net
www.macrolibrarsi.it/autori/_giuseppe_arcidiacono.php

1927 births
1998 deaths
People from Acireale
20th-century Italian physicists
Academic staff of the University of Perugia
Scientists from Sicily